The Chicagoland Football League is a football league based in Chicago. It has 12 teams. The league was founded on May 31, 1917, and has the distinction of having never added or changed any of its teams. The league was dormant from 1935 to 2004 the league was canceled, with all teams reconstituted for 2005.

The modern Chicagoland Football League (ChFL), a semi-pro league that ran from 1973 to 2004, is unrelated to the original league.

Teams

Division 1
Bulls
Chicago Chargers
Chicago Panthers
Chicago Thunder
Chicago Dolphins
Chicago Grizzlies

Division 2
Chicago Horsemen
Chicago Renegades
Cook County Punishers
Lake County Chiefs
Lions
Oakland County Coyotes

Past Championships

1917-Thunder 23, Horsemen  0
1918-Thunder 14, Horsemen 13
1919-Thunder 17, Horsemen 10
1920-Thunder 49, Punishers 3
1921-Grizzlies 35,Renegades 7
1922-Thunder 9, Chiefs 0
1923-Bulls 34, Chiefs 0
1924-Bulls 45, Chiefs 10
1925-Bulls 21, Lions 24
1926-Thunder 17, Lions 27
1927-Thunder 20, Lions 27
1928-Thunder 31, Chiefs 30
1929-Panthers 48, Lions 17
1930-Dolphins 3, Coyotes 35
1931-Dolphins 10, Lions 45
1932-Grizzlies 16, Lions 6
1933-Grizzlies 3, Punishers 0
1934-GrIzzlies 23, Punishers 7
(1935 - 2004 dormant)
2005-Thunder 17, Punishers 13
2006-Thunder 37, Chiefs 21
2007-Thunder 7, Chiefs 38
2008-Thunder 21, Lions 9
2009-Grizzlies 38, Lions 27
2010-Grizzlies 51, Lions 66
2011-Grizzlies 48, Lions 7
2012-Chiefs 21, Lions 17

External links
Chicagoland League Champions
MascotDB.com
Chicagoland Youth Football League

References

American football leagues in the United States
Semi-professional American football